Charles McVean (1802 – December 22, 1848) was an American lawyer and newspaperman who served one term as a U.S. Representative from New York from 1833 to 1835,

Biography 
Born near Johnstown, New York, McVean pursued an academic course.  He studied law, was admitted to the bar and commenced practice in Johnstown. He was editor of a newspaper in Canajoharie 1827–1831.

Congress 
McVean was elected as a Jacksonian to the Twenty-third Congress (March 4, 1833 – March 3, 1835). He was not a candidate for renomination in 1834.

Later career 
He served as district attorney of Montgomery County in 1836–1839.

He moved to New York City in 1839, where he resumed the practice of his profession.  He was appointed surrogate of New York County January 24, 1844, and served until 1848.  He was appointed United States Attorney for the Southern District of New York September 1, 1848.

Death 
He died in New York City, December 22, 1848, and was interred in St. Andrew's Cemetery.

Sources

1802 births
1848 deaths
United States Attorneys for the Southern District of New York
County district attorneys in New York (state)
New York (state) state court judges
People from Johnstown, New York
Jacksonian members of the United States House of Representatives from New York (state)
19th-century American politicians
Members of the United States House of Representatives from New York (state)